Hambden is an unincorporated community in Geauga County, in the U.S. state of Ohio.

History
A post office called Hampden was established in 1826, and remained in operation until 1906. The community most likely was named after Hampden, Massachusetts.

References

Unincorporated communities in Geauga County, Ohio
Unincorporated communities in Ohio